Santiago x The Natural is a hip hop duo consisting of vocalist Lawrence Santiago and rapper Jeff Stephens. The duo met at the University of Notre Dame and began collaborating in 2004. Santiago x The Natural officially formed in 2011. RedEye named Santiago x The Natural one of the top unsigned artists in 2012.

History
Jeff Stephens was raised by his grandmother in the South Side of Chicago. During his junior year of high school, Stephens was selected to attend a week-long camp at the University of Notre Dame and knew he wanted to attend the university after high school. Stephens' early life influenced his musical and professional career. He mentors young students with his rap music and works with nonprofits to expand the opportunities of underprivileged youth.

Santiago and Stephens met as students at the University of Notre Dame. The two met at the university's dining hall when Stephens asked to use Santiago's recording studio. Santiago, then a fourth year architecture student, had transformed his dorm into a recording studio for his rock band, Station One. Stephens and Santiago began working together after Santiago heard Stephens' mixed-tapes.

After graduating from Notre Dame, Santiago was in a rock band and worked on his own music while pursuing his career as an architect in Los Angeles, California. Santiago collaborated with Stephens for a couple of tracks before officially forming Santiago x The Natural in 2011. During the summer of 2012, Santiago left his architectural career in Los Angeles and moved to Chicago, Illinois where Stephens works as an attorney.

In September 2012, the University of Notre Dame featured Santiago x The Natural at a pep rally. RedEye named the duo one of Chicago's top unsigned artists in 2012. The duo placed second in RedEyes Rock n' Vote band competition in 2012. That year they released the single "Got A Hold of Me". The single was selected to be played on ESPN Unite and ESPN First Take.

Santiago x The Natural performed with rapper Talib Kweli in April 2013. ESPN licensed Santiago x The Natural's song "Warriors" for the official BCS national championship playlist and Friday Night Fights boxing. The single was also featured on the Spirit of Notre Dame album and chosen as the official theme song for the Minnesota Swarm, a professional lacrosse team.

In June 2013, the duo performed at the North by Northeast music festival in Toronto, Ontario, Canada.

The Natural has opened for Akon, Clips, Mýa and Cake. Santiago has opened for Wyclef Jean, Lyfe Jennings and Avant.

References

Musical groups established in 2011
Midwest hip hop groups
Hip hop duos
2011 establishments in Indiana